This is a list of airlines currently operating in Tunisia.

Defunct airlines 
This is a list of defunct airlines of Tunisia.

See also
 List of airports in Tunisia
 List of companies based in Tunisia

References

Tunisia
Airlines
Airlines
Tunisia